Zhang Xian (born 16 March 1985) is a Chinese retired volleyball player. She is a member of the China women's national volleyball team and played for Liaoning in 2012.

She was part of the Chinese national team at the 2012 Summer Olympics in London, Great Britain.

Clubs
  Fujian (1998 - 2003) as an outside hitter
  Yunnan (2003 - 2011) starting as a libero
  Liaoning (2011 - 2013)
  Guangdong Evergrande (2013) only for 2013 FIVB Volleyball Women's Club World Championship
  Yunnan (2013 - 2017)

References

External links

1985 births
Living people
Chinese women's volleyball players
Volleyball players from Fujian
Olympic volleyball players of China
Volleyball players at the 2012 Summer Olympics
Asian Games medalists in volleyball
Volleyball players at the 2010 Asian Games
Asian Games gold medalists for China
Medalists at the 2010 Asian Games
Sportspeople from Fuzhou
Liberos
21st-century Chinese women